Hydrovatus bonvouloiri, is a species of predaceous diving beetle found in India, Sri Lanka, Malayasia, Myanmar, China, Japan, Vietnam, Formosa, Indonesia, Thailand, Laos, Taiwan, and Philippines.

Body is large with an average length of 3.5 to 3.7 mm.

References 

Dytiscidae
Insects of Sri Lanka
Insects described in 1882